"Internet Friends" is a song by Australian electro house duo Knife Party. It was released on 2011 as the first single from the Knife Party EP, 100% No Modern Talking by Knife Party members (the former members of the drum and bass band Pendulum), Rob Swire and Gareth McGrillen. The song entered the UK Singles Chart at number 89 due to strong sales, despite being initially available for free download. The song was featured on the fifth season of The Walking Dead. In 2013, a "VIP" remix of the song was featured on the Knife Party EP, Haunted House.

Charts

Certifications

References

2011 songs
Mass media about Internet culture
Songs written by Rob Swire
Works about Facebook